The Writers Guild Award for Best Written Western was an award presented from 1949 to 1951 by the Writers Guild of America, after which it was discontinued.

Winners & Nominees

Notes 

 The year indicates when the film was released. The awards are presented the following year.

References

External links
WGA.org

Writers Guild of America Awards